Endocronartium is a genus of rust fungi in the Cronartiaceae family. The genus contains three species found in Europe, North America, and Japan, that grow on Pinus trees. Endocronartium was circumscribed by Hiratsuka in 1969.

References

External links

Teliomycotina